Bonita Creek Estates is a populated place in Gila County, Arizona, United States.

References

Populated places in Gila County, Arizona